Johnston Gardens is a small public garden in Aberdeen, Scotland. The garden has won the Britain in Bloom competition many times.

The gardens are full with flowers and shrubbery which sole purpose is for aesthetics. This is a very popular place for wedding photographs to be taken.

Access

Access is from Viewfield Road close to the Gordon Highlanders Museum in the Rubislaw district of central Aberdeen.

History 
The park was formerly part of the Johnston House estate, but was gifted to the city in 1936.

Content

The park contains a Japanese garden centred upon a pond and arched bridge. This section contains bamboos and a wide selection of acers. The paths are lined with rhododendrons and tall beech trees.

Memorials

The park contains a memorial to the men killed on helicopter flight G-REDL 85N on 1 April 2009.

See also

Green spaces and walkways in Aberdeen

References

External links
Johnston Gardens
Photo of the gardens

Gardens in Aberdeen